Ana Alicia Guerra Morales (born 18 February 1994), better known as Ana Guerra, is a Spanish singer. She rose to prominence when she took part in series nine of the reality television talent competition Operación Triunfo, where she finished in fifth place.

She was a candidate to represent Spain in the Eurovision Song Contest 2018, with two songs, "El remedio", and a duet with fellow contestant 
Aitana Ocaña entitled "Lo malo". Finally, neither was selected to represent the country in the European contest, while "Lo malo" did get to represent Spain at the OGAE Second Chance Contest. "Lo malo", which was voted in third place with 26%, reached the top of the Spanish chart and obtained a quintuple platinum certification with 180,000 digital purchases.

After her departure from Operación Triunfo 2017, Guerra collaborated with Juan Magán on the song "Ni la hora". In its first week of release, it reached number one on the Spanish songs chart. It was later certified triple platinum in Spain. Her single "Bajito" was also certified gold. In 2018 she became the second Spanish female artist in history to have two songs over 30 million streams on Spotify Spain. The digital newspaper El Español considers her to be one of the most successful contestants of Operación Triunfo.

Biography 
Ana Alicia Guerra Morales was born on 18 February 1994 in San Cristóbal de La Laguna, Tenerife, in the Province of Santa Cruz de Tenerife. She is the daughter of Antonio Guerra, a nurse, and Fátima Morales. Her name is in honor of the Mexican-American actress, Ana Alicia, since her parents liked the American series Falcon Crest. She has one brother. In her childhood, one day her father bought a karaoke machine and that same day Ana learned a Tamara song by heart in less than ten minutes. 

She studied transverse flute for eight years at the Professional Conservatory of Music of Santa Cruz de Tenerife. Later, Guerra worked as a perfume consultant, waitress, and actress in musicals.

Career 
Guerra auditioned for series 9 of Operación Triunfo and was selected to enter the show's "Academy" on 23 October 2017. On the 12th "gala" or live show on 22 January 2018, it was decided by the public that she would be one of the five finalists of the series.

In Operación Triunfo, Guerra also competed to represent Spain in the Eurovision Song Contest 2018 with the entries "El remedio", which she performed solo, and "Lo malo", which she performed in a duet with Aitana. The latter song, originally written in English language by Jess Morgan and Will Simms and adapted into Spanish language by Brisa Fenoy, finished in third place, but went on to become a number-one hit on the Spanish Singles Chart and received a double platinum certification. The single reached number one on the Spanish PROMUSICAE during three weeks. The former entry, "El remedio", which was authored by Nabález, was released as a single in April 2018.

On 6 July 2018, Guerra released a single with Juan Magán titled "Ni la hora". The single debuted at number two on the Spanish Singles Chart, and its official music video got more than 4.5 million views on YouTube in five days. On 6 December 2018 she released the solo single "Bajito", where she appeared with Javier Calvo, Javier Ambrossi, Dulceida, Alba Paul, Miguel Diosdado and Antonia Payeras. It received bad critics due to its erotic content.

On 25 January 2019 she released her first album titled "Reflexión". The album was a success, ranking at number two on the official sales charts. Also at the beginning of that year, Ana participated as guest artist in David Bustamante's new album entitled "Héroes en tiempos de Guerra", specifically in the song "Desde que te vi". Guerra had already sung with Bustamante live at the Caminando Juntos concert at the Santiago Bernabéu Stadium in Madrid in June 2018.

She appeared along Roi Méndez in the second episode of 99 lugares donde pasar miedo, aired on 4 May 2019 on Discovery MAX, where they visited the Loch Ness, Comlongon Castle and Greyfriars Kirkyard.

Between September 2019 and January 2020, Guerra toured 16 cities across Spain with her fellow Operación Triunfo castmate Luis Cepeda on the ImaginBank tour.

By December 2019, Guerra had nine platinum records and two gold records. More than 90,000 followers through their social networks and with more than 85 million views on her YouTube channel. Her EP Reflexión exceeded 100 million views. Also during that year, Guerra shared the stage with Spanish-language music stars like Alejandro Sanz and Juan Luis Guerra.

On 24 September 2021, Ana Guerra's second album called "La luz del martes" was released. The album ranked fourth on the Spanish album chart during the first week of release.

Influences 

Guerra cites Juan Luis Guerra, Michael Bublé and Luis Miguel as her influences. Ana also plays the Western concert flute. On 31 December 2018 it was said she will present the Twelve Grapes with Cristina Pedroche and Brays Efe, but finally it was not carried out. She will performed with Aitana and Greeicy the song Lo malo during Premio Lo Nuestro 2019 in Miami. Finally, in November 2020 it was announced that Ana Guerra will present the New Year's bells from Santa Cruz de Tenerife live for all of Spain accompanied by Roberto Herrera, presenter of the television network TVE Canarias. The event was followed by 4,734,000 viewers with a 27.2% audience share.

Personal life 
From 2014 to June 2018, Guerra was in a relationship with the singer, Javier Luis Delgado, better known as Jadel, who won the talent show El Número Uno in 2012. 

From 2018 to 2020, Guerra was in a relationship with the actor, Miguel Ángel Muñoz. 

Since 2022, Guerra is in a relationship with the actor, singer, musician and musical director, Víctor Elías.

Advertising and other projects 
In March 2018, after his departure from the program, he recorded the song Fugitiva, which is the header of the series of the same name on TVE.

Ana became the image of the Spanish cosmetic brand Camaleón Cosmetic in June 2018. Months later she would be the promotional image for the Skechers España brand.

She sang with Aitana, Lola Índigo, Raoul Vázquez and Agoney for the Coca-Cola advertising campaign for Christmas.

In September 2019, Guerra was announced as the face of a 2020 collection from the wedding dress company Pronovias.

In September 2020, Ana covers the song by Raffaella Carrà entitled En el amor todo es empezar, and which was the soundtrack of the Spanish film Explota, explota. In November of that year she performed the theme song for a Disney Christmas short film entitled Historias que nos unen.

In early 2021, he collaborated on the video clip for the song Es lo que hay by the singer and fellow OT 2017 member Ricky Merino. This video clip also had the participation of Roi Méndez. On 8 January 2022, Ana Guerra was one of the singers participating in the solidarity concert Más fuerte que el volcán, which was organized by Televisión Española in order to raise funds for those affected by the 2021 Cumbre Vieja volcanic eruption. For her part, on 8 March, Ana participated in the charity concert Mujeres cantan a Rocío Jurado, coinciding with International Women's Day.

In September 2022, he promoted Rakuten TV's adventure reality show Discovering Canary Islands at the San Sebastián Film Festival. It is a program in which the contestants explore various corners of the Canary Islands.

In January 2023, she became a contestant on the third edition of El desafío on Antena 3. For her part, that same month she was confirmed as one of the presenters of the new RTVE musical talent called Cover night, along with Ruth Lorenzo and Abraham Mateo.

Discography

EP 
 Reflexión (2019)

Studio albums 
 Sus Canciones (Operación Triunfo 2017)
 La Luz del Martes (2021)

Filmography

Television

Awards and nominations

LOS40 Music Awards

Odeon Awards

Other awards

References

External links

 
 

1994 births
Living people
21st-century Spanish singers
Spanish women pop singers
People from San Cristóbal de La Laguna
Operación Triunfo contestants
Singers from the Canary Islands
Spanish pop musicians
Spanish-language singers
21st-century Spanish women singers
Women in Latin music